Treasureton is an unincorporated community in Franklin County, in the U.S. state of Idaho.

History
A post office called Treasureton was established in 1881, and remained in operation until it was discontinued in 1944. William Treasure, the first postmaster, gave the community its name.

References

Unincorporated communities in Franklin County, Idaho
Unincorporated communities in Idaho